The 2003–04 First League of Serbia and Montenegro was the second and first full season of the Serbia and Montenegro's top-level football league since its establishment. It was contested by 16 teams, and Red Star Belgrade won the championship.

Teams 
Rad, Čukarički, Javor Ivanjica, Rudar, Mogren and Radnički Niš were relegated to the 2003–04 Second League of Serbia and Montenegro.

The relegated teams were replaced by 2002–03 Second League of Serbia and Montenegro east, west, south and north champions Budućnost Banatski Dvor, Napredak Kruševac, Kom and Borac Čačak.

League table

Results

Winning squad
Champions: Red Star Belgrade (Coach: Slavoljub Muslin)

Players (league matches/league goals)
  Dušan Basta
  Nikola Beljić
  Dragan Bogavac
  Jadranko Bogičević
  Branko Bošković
  Nemanja Vidić
  Milivoje Vitakić
  Vladimir Dišljenković (goalkeeper)
  Ivan Dudić
  Milan Dudić
  Bojan Djordjic
  Slavoljub Đorđević
  Nikola Žigić
  Dejan Ilić
  Boško Janković
  Nenad Kovačević
  Radovan Krivokapić
  Marjan Marković
  Bojan Miladinović
  Dejan Milovanović
  Dragan Mladenović
  Dragan Mrđa
  Marko Muslin
  Sanibal Orahovac
  Marko Pantelić
  Marko Perović
  Ivan Ranđelović (goalkeeper)
  Nenad Stojanović
  Dragan Šarac
Source:

Top goalscorers

References

External links 
 Table and results at RSSSF

First League of Serbia and Montenegro
1
1
Serbia